In mathematics and in theoretical physics, the Stone–von Neumann theorem refers to any one of a number of different formulations of the uniqueness of the canonical commutation relations between position and momentum operators. It is named after Marshall Stone and John von Neumann.

Representation issues of the commutation relations
In quantum mechanics, physical observables are represented mathematically by linear operators on Hilbert spaces.

For a single particle moving on the real line , there are two important observables: position and momentum.  In the  Schrödinger representation quantum description of such a particle, the position operator  and momentum operator  are respectively given by

Assume  to be a fixed non-zero real number—in quantum theory  is the reduced Planck's constant, which carries units of action (energy times time).

The operators ,  satisfy the canonical commutation relation Lie algebra,

Already in his classic book, Hermann Weyl observed that this commutation law was impossible to satisfy for linear operators ,  acting on finite-dimensional spaces unless  vanishes. This is apparent from taking the trace over both sides of the latter equation and using the relation ; the left-hand side is zero, the right-hand side is non-zero. Further analysis shows that any two self-adjoint operators satisfying the above commutation relation cannot be both bounded (in fact, a theorem of  Wielandt shows the relation cannot be satisfied by elements of any normed algebra). We assume this normalization in what follows.

The idea of the Stone–von Neumann theorem is that any two irreducible representations of the canonical commutation relations are unitarily equivalent. Since, however, the operators involved are necessarily unbounded (as noted above), there are tricky domain issues that allow for counter-examples. To obtain a rigorous result, one must require that the operators satisfy the exponentiated form of the canonical commutation relations, known as the Weyl relations. The exponentiated operators are bounded and unitary.  Although, as noted below, these relations are formally equivalent to the standard canonical commutation relations, this equivalence is not rigorous, because (again) of the unbounded nature of the operators. (There is also a discrete analog of the Weyl relations, which can hold in a finite-dimensional space, namely Sylvester's clock and shift matrices in the finite Heisenberg group, discussed below.)

Uniqueness of representation 
One would like to classify representations of the canonical commutation relation by two self-adjoint operators acting on separable Hilbert spaces, up to unitary equivalence. By Stone's theorem, there is a one-to-one correspondence between self-adjoint operators and (strongly continuous) one-parameter unitary groups.

A formal computation (using a special case of the Baker–Campbell–Hausdorff formula) readily yields

Conversely, given two one-parameter unitary groups  and  satisfying the braiding relation

formally differentiating at 0 shows that the two infinitesimal generators satisfy the above canonical commutation relation. This braiding formulation of the canonical commutation relations (CCR) for one-parameter unitary groups is called the Weyl form of the CCR.

It is important to note that the preceding derivation is purely formal. Since the operators involved are unbounded, technical issues prevent application of the Baker–Campbell–Hausdorff formula without additional domain assumptions. Indeed, there exist operators satisfying the canonical commutation relation but not the Weyl relations. Nevertheless, in "good" cases, we expect that operators satisfying the canonical commutation relation will also satisfy the Weyl relations.

The answer is the content of the Stone–von Neumann theorem: all such pairs of one-parameter unitary groups are unitarily equivalent. In other words, for any two such  and  acting jointly irreducibly on a Hilbert space , there is a unitary operator  so that

There is also a straightforward extension of the Stone–von Neumann theorem to  degrees of freedom.
Historically, this result was significant, because it was a key step in proving that Heisenberg's matrix mechanics, which presents quantum mechanical observables and dynamics in terms of infinite matrices, is unitarily equivalent to Schrödinger's wave mechanical formulation (see Schrödinger picture),

Representation theory formulation 
In terms of representation theory, the Stone–von Neumann theorem classifies certain unitary representations of the Heisenberg group. This is discussed in more detail in the Heisenberg group section, below.

Alternatively, that they are all equivalent to the Weyl algebra (or CCR algebra) on a symplectic space of dimension .

More formally, there is a unique (up to scale) non-trivial central strongly continuous unitary representation.

This was later generalized by Mackey theory – and was the motivation for the introduction of the Heisenberg group in quantum physics.

In detail:

In all cases, if one has a representation , where  is an algebra and the center maps to zero, then one simply has a representation of the corresponding abelian group or algebra, which is Fourier theory.

If the center does not map to zero, one has a more interesting theory, particularly if one restricts oneself to central representations.

Concretely, by a central representation one means a representation such that the center of the Heisenberg group maps into the center of the algebra: for example, if one is studying matrix representations or representations by operators on a Hilbert space, then the center of the matrix algebra or the operator algebra is the scalar matrices. Thus the representation of the center of the Heisenberg group is determined by a scale value, called the quantization value (in physics terms, Planck's constant), and if this goes to zero, one gets a representation of the abelian group (in physics terms, this is the classical limit).

More formally, the group algebra of the Heisenberg group over its field of scalars K, written , has center , so rather than simply thinking of the group algebra as an algebra over the field , one may think of it as an algebra over the commutative algebra . As the center of a matrix algebra or operator algebra is the scalar matrices, a -structure on the matrix algebra is a choice of scalar matrix – a choice of scale. Given such a choice of scale, a central representation of the Heisenberg group is a map of -algebras , which is the formal way of saying that it sends the center to a chosen scale.

Then the Stone–von Neumann theorem is that, given the standard quantum mechanical scale (effectively, the value of ħ), every strongly continuous unitary representation is unitarily equivalent to the standard representation with position and momentum.

Reformulation via Fourier transform 
The Fourier–Plancherel transform defined by

When  is the real line , this is Stone's theorem characterizing one-parameter unitary groups. The theorem of Stone–von Neumann can also be restated using similar language.

So a covariant representation corresponding to the *-crossed product

It is a general fact that covariant representations are in one-to-one correspondence with *-representation of the corresponding crossed product. On the other hand, all irreducible representations of

Therefore, all pairs  are unitarily equivalent. Specializing to the case where  yields the Stone–von Neumann theorem.

The Heisenberg group
This is the Lie group of  square matrices of the form

In fact, using the Heisenberg group, one can reformulate the Stone von Neumann theorem in the language of representation theory. 

Note that the center of  consists of matrices . However, this center is not the identity operator in Heisenberg's original CCRs.

and the central generator  is not the identity.

To show  is multiplicative is a straightforward calculation. The hard part of the theorem is showing the uniqueness; this claim, nevertheless, follows easily from the Stone–von Neumann theorem as stated above. We will sketch below a proof of the corresponding Stone–von Neumann theorem for certain finite Heisenberg groups.

One representation of the Heisenberg group which is important in number theory and the theory of modular forms is the theta representation, so named because the Jacobi theta function is invariant under the action of the discrete subgroup of the Heisenberg group.

Relation to the Fourier transform 
For any non-zero , the mapping

Moreover, by irreducibility of the representations , it follows that up to a scalar, such an operator  is unique (cf. Schur's lemma).  Since  is unitary, this scalar multiple is uniquely determined and hence such an operator  is unique.

This  theorem has the immediate implication that the Fourier transform is unitary, also known as the Plancherel theorem.  Moreover,  

From this fact the Fourier inversion formula easily follows.

Example: The Segal–Bargmann space
The Segal–Bargmann space is the space of holomorphic functions on  that are square-integrable with respect to a Gaussian measure. Fock observed in 1920s that the operators

acting on holomorphic functions, satisfy the same commutation relations as the usual annihilation and creation operators, namely,

It is not hard to show that the exponentials of these operators satisfy the Weyl relations and that the exponentiated operators act irreducibly. This unitary map is the Segal–Bargmann transform.

Representations of finite Heisenberg groups 
The Heisenberg group  is defined for any commutative ring . In this section let us specialize to the field  for  a prime. Note that  is finite with cardinality . For finite Heisenberg group  one can give a simple proof of the Stone–von Neumann theorem using simple properties of character functions of representations. These properties follow from the orthogonality relations for characters of representations of finite groups.

For any non-zero  in  define the representation  on the finite-dimensional inner product space  by

It follows that

By the orthogonality relations for characters of representations of finite groups this fact implies the corresponding Stone–von Neumann theorem for Heisenberg groups , particularly:
 Irreducibility of 
 Pairwise inequivalence of all the representations .

Generalizations 
The Stone–von Neumann theorem admits numerous generalizations.  Much of the early work of George Mackey was directed at obtaining a formulation of the theory of induced representations developed originally by Frobenius for finite groups to the context of unitary representations of locally compact topological groups.

See also

 Oscillator representation
 Wigner–Weyl transform
 CCR and CAR algebras (for bosons and fermions respectively)
 Segal–Bargmann space
 Moyal product
 Weyl algebra
 Stone's theorem on one-parameter unitary groups
 Hille–Yosida theorem
 C0-semigroup

Notes

References 

 Rosenberg,  Jonathan  (2004) "A Selective History of the Stone–von Neumann Theorem"   Contemporary Mathematics 365.  American Mathematical Society.
 Summers, Stephen J. (2001). "On the Stone–von Neumann Uniqueness Theorem and Its Ramifications." In John von Neumann and the foundations of quantum physics, pp. 135-152. Springer, Dordrecht, 2001, online.

Functional analysis
Mathematical quantization
Theorems in functional analysis
Theorems in mathematical physics
John von Neumann